Alcide Louis "Slow Drag" Pavageau (March 7, 1888 – January 19, 1969) was an American jazz guitarist and double-bassist.

Biography 
Pavageau was born in New Orleans, Louisiana. He started his career as a dancer, mastering a dance called the Slow Drag  which resulted in his nickname. He learned the guitar as a young man from his cousin Ulysses Picou, a singer in New Orleans. Pavageau came from a musical family and was related to families like the Tios, Picous and Pirons who formed some of the earliest jazz bands. He played Buddy Petit, Bunk Johnson, and Herb Morand. Johnson bragged that he taught Louis Armstrong how to play cornet by ear. He started playing bass in 1927 when he was 39 years old and joined George Lewis's band from 1943 and also played in Bunk Johnson's band in New York City in 1945. He toured with Lewis through the end of the 1950s. In 1961, while playing with the Louis Cottrell Trio, he recorded New Orleans: The Living Legends for Riverside. He worked at Preservation Hall in the 1960s and recorded one album as a leader in 1965 in addition to frequent recording with Lewis.

Pavageau was the son of Ferreol "Joseph" Pavageau and Alice Philippe. He was the descendant of a marriage between two of the oldest Creole families in New Orleans. His family traced their roots to wealthy French planters who were displaced by the Haitian Revolution and friends of Bienville, the founder of New Orleans. For almost 40 years he was the Grand Marshal of the Second Line of the Mardi Gras Parade. The second line is known for twirling ornamental umbrellas during their gatherings. The twirling of umbrellas may have been adapted from the early Italian immigrant custom of using umbrellas at funeral processions.  Alcide died in 1969 in New Orleans at the age of 80.

Although rumors abound about Alcide Pavageau being a nephew of renowned New Orleans voodoo queen Marie Laveau, this is not true.

Discography

As leader 
 Slow Drag's Bunch (Jazz Crusade)

As sideman 
 Sweet Emma Barrett, New Orleans' Sweet Emma and Her Preservation Hall Jazz Band (Preservation Hall, 1964)
 Louis Cottrell Jr., The Louis Cottrell Trio: Bourbon Street (Riverside, 1961)
 Bunk Johnson, New Orleans 1944 (American Music)
 Bunk Johnson, Hot Jazz (RCA Victo, 1946)
 George Lewis, New Orleans Jazz Band And Quartet (Riverside, 1954)
 George Lewis, George Lewis & Turk Murphy at Newport (Verve, 1957)
 George Lewis, The Perennial George Lewis (Verve, 1958)
 Jim Robinson, Jim Robinson's New Orleans Band (Riverside, 1961)
 Jim Robinson, Jim Robinson Plays Spirituals And Blues (Riverside, 1961)

References
Footnotes

General references
Scott Yanow, [ Alcide Pavageau] at AllMusic

External links
Alcide Pavageau at Discogs

1888 births
1969 deaths
American jazz double-bassists
Male double-bassists
20th-century double-bassists
20th-century American male musicians
American male jazz musicians
Preservation Hall Jazz Band members